Chloë N. Duckworth  is a British archaeological scientist and reader in the School of History, Classics and Archaeology, Newcastle University, and a presenter of The Great British Dig.

Education
After receiving her BA (Hons) in Archaeology, Duckworth was awarded funding from the Arts and Humanities Research Council to study for an MSc and subsequently a PhD at the University of Nottingham. Her PhD, awarded in 2011, was supervised by Julian Henderson and was titled The created stone: chemical and archaeological perspectives on the colour and material properties of early Egyptian glass, 1500–1200 B.C..

Career and research
Duckworth joined Newcastle University in 2016, following her position at the University of Leicester as a postdoctoral researcher on European Research Council funded Trans-Sahara project. She held a British Academy Postdoctoral Fellowship in 2015. She is the director of two field projects at UNESCO World Heritage Sites in Spain: the Madinat al-Zahra Survey Project  and The Alhambra Royal Workshops project. Her research group at Newcastle University aims to reconstruct the technology of glass in the past by using experimental reconstructions, texts, and scientific analysis. She is a member of the editorial board of World Archaeology journal, and an external examiner for the University of Oxford.  She was elected as a fellow of the Society of Antiquaries of London on 5 May 2017. She is also a Fellow of the Higher Education Academy and a Member of the Chartered Institute for Archaeologists. Until September 2021, she co-directed the Newcastle University Centre for Heritage.  she holds the position of reader in archaeological science and public engagement in the School of History, Classics and Archaeology at the University of Newcastle.  

Recycling and Re-Use in the Roman Economy, which Duckworth co-edited with Andrew Wilson in 2020, was both praised as a summary of the present research on the topic and as 'a starting point for further research'. It was also noted as likely to 'catalyze studies of recycling and reuse in and beyond the Roman world for years to come.' by Linda R. Gosner in the American Journal of Archaeology.

As well as her academic career, Duckworth is a television presenter and public speaker. In 2017 she was part of the BBC Expert Women and in 2019 was a presenter at the New Scientist Live Show. Since 2020 she has presented Channel 4's The Great British Dig with Hugh Dennis. She authored a book of the same title in 2022 to accompany the series.

She was shortlisted for the Council for British Archaeology's "Outstanding Archaeological Achievement" award in 2021.

Personal life and advocacy 
In 2021, Duckworth launched the "Dig for Archaeology" campaign, which seeks to promote the positive aspects of commercial, academic and community archaeology in the UK, and to raise awareness of the threats it faces. She advocates increasing diversity and representation in archaeology, and is a committee member of the Chartered Institute for Archaeologists's Equality and Diversity Group.

She lives in Northumberland.

Selected publications

References

External links

Living people
British women archaeologists
British archaeologists
Alumni of the University of Nottingham
1981 births
Fellows of the Society of Antiquaries of London
Fellows of the Higher Education Academy
British television presenters
British women historians
Academics of Newcastle University
British women academics
21st-century British non-fiction writers
British women non-fiction writers
21st-century British women writers
21st-century British historians